Kajsa Armborg (born 29 June 1998) is a Swedish ice hockey forward, currently playing with HV71 Dam of the Swedish Women's Hockey League. She previously played seven seasons with Leksands IF Dam, serving as an alternate captain in the 2019–20 and 2020–21 seasons. In 2016, she won a bronze medal with Sweden at the World U18 Championship.

Personal life  
Outside of hockey, Armborg works in a pre-school. She played youth football for Örebro SK and was named the region's most promising player multiple times.

References

External links
 

1998 births
Living people
Sportspeople from Örebro
Swedish women's ice hockey centres
HV71 Dam players
Leksands IF Dam players
21st-century Swedish women